The 2007 San Francisco International Airport runway incursion occurred around 1:36 p.m. PDT on May 26, 2007, when SkyWest Airlines (operating as United Express) Flight 5741, an Embraer EMB 120 Brasilia turboprop aircraft, nearly collided with Republic Airways (operating as Frontier Airlines) Flight 4912, an Embraer 170 Regional Jet, at the intersection of Runways 1L and 28R at San Francisco International Airport (SFO).

There were no injuries to occupants and no damage to either aircraft. Federal Aviation Administration officials described the runway incursion as the most serious incident of its kind in at least a decade, and the National Transportation Safety Board carried out an investigation into the incident.

Incident

The SkyWest aircraft was arriving at SFO after a flight from Modesto, California, and was cleared to land on Runway 28R. At the same time, the Republic Airlines aircraft, bound for Los Angeles, was instructed to taxi into position and hold on the intersecting Runway 1L. As the landing SkyWest aircraft passed the runway threshold, the Republic Airlines aircraft was cleared for takeoff. Local procedures and FAA Order 7110.65 require the local controller to wait until the landing aircraft has passed through the intersection before clearing an aircraft for takeoff on one of the intersecting runways.

Approximately 27 seconds later the Airport Movement Area Safety System issued an aural warning of an imminent collision, and the local controller instructed the SkyWest aircraft to stop, transmitting, "uh, sky-, skywest uhh fifty seven forty one HOLD HOLD HOLD." The SkyWest aircraft stopped in the intersection of Runways 1L and 28R, while the Republic Airlines flight lifted off and overflew it.

Investigation

The Federal Aviation Administration (FAA) classified the incident as a Category A runway incursion, the most serious type. Category A events are those in which "[s]eparation decreases and participants take extreme action to narrowly avoid a collision, or the event results in a collision." Of the previous 15 runway incursions at SFO between 2001 and 2007, none had been more serious than Category C, which is defined as a situation in which "[s]eparation decreases but there is ample time and distance to avoid a potential collision."

Commenting on the seriousness of the incident, National Transportation Safety Board (NTSB) spokesman Ted Lopatkiewicz noted that "We investigate probably just a handful (of incursions) a year." The NTSB's investigation was completed in November 2007, concluding that the controller had failed to provide adequate separation between the two aircraft. FAA spokesman Ian Gregor said, "This wasn't a procedural issue, this was caused by a good controller with a lot of experience making a mistake," adding that since the incursion the controller, who had over 20 years of experience, was recertified.

SFO and AMASS

Runway safety and prevention of runway incursions has been a priority concern for both the FAA and NTSB; it has been on the NTSB's annual list of "Most Wanted Improvements" continuously since 1990.

The Airport Movement Area Safety System (AMASS) is an airport surveillance radar system that is designed to detect potential runway conflicts and alert controllers. SFO was selected by the FAA for the first test installation of the AMASS system, where it became operational in June 2001 before its rollout to 40 airports around the U.S. AMASS is designed to provide an alert 15 seconds before aircraft reach the conflict point. The system performed as designed in the incident at SFO, though it did not alert in time to prevent the runway incursion.  The NTSB believes that AMASS is insufficient to prevent runway incursions.

Aftermath
, N872RW has continued to fly for Republic Airways under various brands. The EMB-120 involved would later be sold to Menard Inc. in May 2009 and re-registered as N957M. It was sold in October 2011 to Team Aero LLC. In 2018, the aircraft was stored and later scrapped.

See also

 Runway incursion
 2005 Logan Airport runway incursion-a narrowly avoided runway incursion at Boston, Massachusetts caused by ATC error
 Air Canada Flight 759—a narrowly avoided runway incursion at SFO in 2017

References

Runway incursions
Aviation accidents and incidents involving the Embraer E-Jet family
Accidents and incidents involving the Embraer EMB 120 Brasilia
2007 San Francisco International Airport runway incursion
San Francisco International Airport runway incursion
Aviation accidents and incidents caused by air traffic controller error
Airliner accidents and incidents in California
2007 in California
May 2007 events in the United States